is a Japanese former handball player who competed in the 1972 Summer Olympics and in the 1976 Summer Olympics.

References

1950 births
Living people
Japanese male handball players
Olympic handball players of Japan
Handball players at the 1972 Summer Olympics
Handball players at the 1976 Summer Olympics
20th-century Japanese people